Emilio Aceval Marín (October 16, 1853 – April 15, 1931) was President of Paraguay from 1898 to 1902. He was a member of the Colorado Party.

Biography
Aceval's parents were Don Leonardo Aceval and Ms Monica Marin. He studied under Fidel Maíz. Upon the outbreak of the war against the Triple Alliance, he joined the Army at age 13 as a child soldier. He was injured at Pirayú and then Ñu Acosta, where he served as a sergeant major. Days later, he was taken prisoner in the battle of Caraguatay.

Upon the end of the war, Aceval moved with his relatives to Corrientes and then to Buenos Aires, where he resumed his studies at National Central College. He studied engineering in the postwar period, but had to stop because of a serious illness. After his recovery, he made a long trip through Europe and the United States, returning in 1881, and became a landowner and farmer. He also served as Minister of Finance and was War and Navy Minister during the government of General Egusquiza. He died in Asuncion on April 15, 1931.

Presidency
 
He was President of the Republic from November 25, 1898 to January 9, 1902. His cabinet was formed by: Joseph P. Urdapilleta, Finance; Jose Second Decoud in Foreign Affairs, Guillermo de los Rios in the Interior; Jose Zacarias Caminos, Venancio V. Lopez, Geronimo Pereira Cazal, Legal and Pedro Jose Tomas Bobadilla, Justice, Worship and Public Instruction, and Colonel John A. Drain in War and Navy.

During the government of President Aceval, Paraguay participated in the Universal Exhibition in Paris and created the National Council on Education, the Directorate General of Schools, and the National Council of Hygiene, as well as the office collecting Internal Revenue, It also suffered from an epidemic of bubonic plague, which led to the creation of the Office Bacteriológica, and settled colonies of immigrants, especially Italians. Paraguay also participated in the International Exhibition of Philadelphia during Aceval's presidency.

A relapse in the political situation caused serious conflicts that were reflected in Parliament. On January 9, 1902, a military revolutionary committee forced Aceval to resign. Congress decided to appoint his replacement as vice president, Don Hector Carballo.

Notes

References
 MSM Encarta (Archived 2009-10-31)

External links

1853 births
1931 deaths
Presidents of Paraguay
Colorado Party (Paraguay) politicians
People from Asunción
Child soldiers
Paraguayan military personnel
People of the Paraguayan War